Hammam Righa District is a district of Aïn Defla Province, Algeria.

Municipalities
The district is further divided into three municipalities.
Hammam Righa
Aïn Bénian
Aïn Torki

Districts of Aïn Defla Province